Fratsia is a village in Greece located roughly in the middle of the island of Kythera.

References 

Populated places in Islands (regional unit)